The 1888 Minnesota Golden Gophers football team represented the University of Minnesota as an independent during the 1888 college football season. This was the third and final season under head coach Frederick S. Jones. Following the 14–0 Minnesota win over Shattuck, the Ariel reported that "The game was followed by a bus-ride about the city, and the University and Shattuck yells combined to make the day hideous till supper time."

Team of 1888: Rush Line, S.S. Start, J. Paul Goode, M.E. Trench, William H. Hoyt, M. H. Gerry, William C. Leary, Birney E. Trask (captain); Quarterback, Alf F. Pillsbury; Halfbacks, John F. Hayden, George K. Belden; Fullback, Grant B. Rossman.

Schedule

References

Minnesota
Minnesota Golden Gophers football seasons
Minnesota Golden Gophers football